Orbit, commonly stylized as ORβIT, is a Japanese-South Korean boy group formed by seven members who participated in the 2019 reality competition show Produce 101 Japan. The group consists of Younghoon, Heecho, Yoondong, June, Tomo, Shunya, and Yugo. The group debuted on November 11, 2020, with the release of their studio album titled 00.

History

Pre-debut
Heecho (under the name Heecheon), Younghoon (under the stage name Ooon), and Yoondong are former members of South Korean boy group HALO, which disbanded on May 8, 2019. June (under the name Jun Uehara) competed on South Korea's Mnet reality-survival program Produce X 101 and finished in 91st place.

All seven members participated in Japan's spin-off series Produce 101 Japan under their legal names. However, the three former HALO members had left the show prior to its finale, citing personal reasons. June, along with individual trainees Tomoaki Ando, Shunya Osawa, and Yugo Miyajima were eliminated in the show's finale and finished in 20th, 14th, 13th, and 12th place, respectively.

2020: Debut with 00

Beginning on February 1, the group and its members were announced daily through a series of individual profile videos. The group released their first track, "Lazurite", a ballad song on June 20. On August 20, the group announced their debut album, 00 (オーツー, pronounced O2) with a November 11 release date under their own music label Present Label. The lead track "Universe" was pre-released digitally on October 16 and the music video was released on November 1.

2021-present: Enchant, Alter Ego
On January 16, it was announced that the group will release their first extended play Enchant on April 21. The album features two lead tracks: "Dionaea" and "Blind". "Blind" was pre-released digitally on Line Music on March 31 and the music video was released on April 19. The music video for "Dionaea" was released on April 17. The album debuted at number one on the Oricon Albums Chart.

On October 10, it was announced that the group will release their second extended play Alter Ego on November 23.

Members
 Younghoon (ヨンフン) (영훈)
 Heecho (ヒチョ) (히쵸) - leader
 Yoondong (ユンドン) (윤동)
 June (ジュン) (준)
 Tomo (トモ) (토모)
 Shunya (シュンヤ) (슌야)
 Yugo (ユウゴ) (유고)

Discography

Studio albums

Extended plays

Singles

Videography

Music videos

References

External links
  

Japanese boy bands
Japanese pop music groups
Japanese idol groups
Musical groups established in 2020
South Korean pop music groups